General Sir William Wellington Godfrey,  (2 April 1880 – 18 May 1952) was a Royal Marines officer who served as Adjutant-General Royal Marines.

Military career
Educated at Dulwich College, Godfrey was commissioned into the Royal Marine Artillery on 1 September 1898. Godfrey made a single appearance in first-class cricket for the Royal Navy against the British Army cricket team at Lord's in 1912, scoring 15 runs in the match. He served on the staff of Captain John de Robeck for the evacuation from Gallipoli in January 1916 during the First World War. He went on to be Assistant Adjutant-General Royal Marines in 1930, Commandant of the Portsmouth Division Royal Marines in 1930 and Adjutant-General Royal Marines in October 1936 before retiring in October 1939.

References

External links
Generals of World War II
Royal Marine Officers 1939−1945

1880 births
1952 deaths
Military personnel from Newry
People educated at Dulwich College
Cricketers from Northern Ireland
Irish cricketers
Royal Navy cricketers
Royal Marines personnel of World War I
Companions of the Order of St Michael and St George
Knights Commander of the Order of the Bath
Royal Marines generals
Royal Marines generals of World War II